Pat Curran (born September 21, 1945) is a retired American football tight end. Curran played for the National Football League's Los Angeles Rams and San Diego Chargers between 1969 and 1978.

Curran is a 1964 graduate of Milwaukee's Juneau High School and a 1968 graduate of Lakeland College near Sheboygan, Wisconsin. He was a two-time NAIA All-American while playing running back at Lakeland and he set a number of school records. Today, he holds Lakeland school records in career, single season and single game scoring and touchdowns, he is #3 in career rushing yards and #4 in single season rushing yards. He is a member of Lakeland's Athletic Hall of Fame.

After retiring as a player, Curran served as a color analyst on Chargers radio broadcasts from 1978 to 1994. He was elected to the NAIA Hall of Fame in 2013. Curran is now a sales representative for Snap-On tools, working out of several automotive technical schools.

References

1945 births
Living people
American football tight ends
Lakeland Muskies football players
Los Angeles Rams players
National Football League announcers
San Diego Chargers announcers
San Diego Chargers players
Sportspeople from Milwaukee
Players of American football from Milwaukee